The Klein–Gordon equation (Klein–Fock–Gordon equation or sometimes Klein–Gordon–Fock equation) is a relativistic wave equation, related to the Schrödinger equation. It is second-order in space and time and manifestly Lorentz-covariant. It is a quantized version of the relativistic energy–momentum relation . Its solutions include a quantum scalar or pseudoscalar field, a field whose quanta are spinless particles. Its theoretical relevance is similar to that of the Dirac equation. Electromagnetic interactions can be incorporated, forming the topic of scalar electrodynamics, but because common spinless particles like the pions are unstable and also experience the strong interaction (with unknown interaction term in the Hamiltonian,) the practical utility is limited.

The equation can be put into the form of a Schrödinger equation. In this form it is expressed as two coupled differential equations, each of first order in time. The solutions have two components, reflecting the charge degree of freedom in relativity. It admits a conserved quantity, but this is not positive definite. The wave function cannot therefore be interpreted as a probability amplitude. The conserved quantity is instead interpreted as electric charge, and the norm squared of the wave function is interpreted as a charge density. The equation describes all spinless particles with positive, negative, and zero charge.

Any solution of the free Dirac equation is, for each of its four components, a solution of the free Klein–Gordon equation. The Klein–Gordon equation does not form the basis of a consistent quantum relativistic one-particle theory. There is no known such theory for particles of any spin. For full reconciliation of quantum mechanics with special relativity, quantum field theory is needed, in which the Klein–Gordon equation reemerges as the equation obeyed by the components of all free quantum fields. In quantum field theory, the solutions of the free (noninteracting) versions of the original equations still play a role. They are needed to build the Hilbert space (Fock space) and to express quantum fields by using complete sets (spanning sets of Hilbert space) of wave functions.

Statement
The Klein–Gordon equation can be written in different ways. The equation itself usually refers to the position space form, where it can be written in terms of separated space and time components  or by combining them into a four-vector . By Fourier transforming the field into momentum space, the solution is usually written in terms of a superposition of plane waves whose energy and momentum obey the energy-momentum dispersion relation from special relativity. Here, the Klein–Gordon equation is given for both of the two common metric signature conventions .

The speed of light  and Planck constant  are often seen to clutter the equations, so they are therefore often expressed in natural units where .

Only by separating out the positive and negative frequency parts does one obtain an equation describing a relativistic wavefunction. For the time-independent case, the Klein–Gordon equation becomes
 
which is formally the same as the homogeneous screened Poisson equation.

Solution for free particle 
Here, the Klein–Gordon equation in natural units, with the metric signature  is solved by Fourier transformation. Inserting the Fourier transformationand using orthogonality of the complex exponentials gives the dispersion relationThis restricts the momenta to those that lie on shell, giving positive and negative energy solutionsFor a new set of constants , the solution then becomesIt is common to handle the positive and negative energy solutions by separating out the negative energies and work only with positive :In the last step,  was renamed. Now we can perform the -integration, picking up the positive frequency part from the delta function only:

This is commonly taken as a general solution to the Klein–Gordon equation. Note that because the initial Fourier transformation contained Lorentz invariant quantities like  only, the last expression is also a Lorentz invariant solution to the Klein–Gordon equation.

History
The equation was named after the physicists Oskar Klein and Walter Gordon, who in 1926 proposed that it describes relativistic electrons. Vladimir Fock also discovered the equation independently in 1926 slightly after Klein's work, in that Klein's paper was received on 28 April 1926, Fock's paper was received on 30 July 1926 and Gordon's paper on 29 September 1926. Other authors making similar claims in that same year Johann Kudar, Théophile de Donder and Frans-H. van den Dungen, and Louis de Broglie. Although it turned out that modeling the electron's spin required the Dirac equation, the Klein–Gordon equation correctly describes the spinless relativistic composite particles, like the pion. On 4 July 2012, European Organization for Nuclear Research CERN announced the discovery of the Higgs boson. Since the Higgs boson is a spin-zero particle, it is the first observed ostensibly  elementary particle to be described by the Klein–Gordon equation. Further experimentation and analysis is required to discern whether the Higgs boson observed is that of the Standard Model or a more exotic, possibly composite, form.

The Klein–Gordon equation was first considered as a quantum wave equation by Schrödinger in his search for an equation describing de Broglie waves. The equation is found in his notebooks from late 1925, and he appears to have prepared a manuscript applying it to the hydrogen atom. The Dirac equation relativistic spectrum is, however, easily recovered if the orbital-momentum quantum number  is replaced by total angular-momentum quantum number . In January 1926, Schrödinger submitted for publication instead his equation, a non-relativistic approximation that predicts the Bohr energy levels of hydrogen without fine structure.

In 1926, soon after the Schrödinger equation was introduced, Vladimir Fock wrote an article about its generalization for the case of magnetic fields, where forces were dependent on velocity, and independently derived this equation. Both Klein and Fock used Kaluza and Klein's method. Fock also determined the gauge theory for the wave equation. The Klein–Gordon equation for a free particle has a simple plane-wave solution.

Derivation
The non-relativistic equation for the energy of a free particle is
 

By quantizing this, we get the non-relativistic Schrödinger equation for a free particle:
 
where 
 
is the momentum operator ( being the del operator), and 
 
is the energy operator.

The Schrödinger equation suffers from not being relativistically invariant, meaning that it is inconsistent with special relativity.

It is natural to try to use the identity from special relativity describing the energy:

 

Then, just inserting the quantum-mechanical operators for momentum and energy yields the equation

 

The square root of a differential operator can be defined with the help of Fourier transformations, but due to the asymmetry of space and time derivatives, Dirac found it impossible to include external electromagnetic fields in a relativistically invariant way. So he looked for another equation that can be modified in order to describe the action of electromagnetic forces. In addition, this equation, as it stands, is nonlocal (see also Introduction to nonlocal equations).

Klein and Gordon instead began with the square of the above identity, i.e.
 
which, when quantized, gives
 

which simplifies to
 

Rearranging terms yields
 

Since all reference to imaginary numbers has been eliminated from this equation, it can be applied to fields that are real-valued, as well as those that have complex values.

Rewriting the first two terms using the inverse of the Minkowski metric , and writing the Einstein summation convention explicitly we get
 

Thus the Klein–Gordon equation can be written in a covariant notation. This often means an abbreviation in the form of
 
where
 
and
 

This operator is called the wave operator.

Today this form is interpreted as the relativistic field equation for spin-0 particles.  Furthermore, any component of any solution to the free Dirac equation (for a spin-1/2 particle) is automatically a solution to the free Klein–Gordon equation. This generalizes to particles of any spin due to the Bargmann–Wigner equations. Furthermore, in quantum field theory, every component of every quantum field must satisfy the free Klein–Gordon equation, making the equation a generic expression of quantum fields.

Klein–Gordon equation in a potential 

The Klein–Gordon equation can be generalized to describe a field in some potential  as
 
Then the Klein–Gordon equation is the case .

Another common choice of potential which arises in interacting theories is the  potential for a real scalar field

Higgs sector 

The pure Higgs boson sector of the Standard model is modelled by a Klein–Gordon field with a potential, denoted  for this section. The Standard model is a gauge theory and so while the field transforms trivially under the Lorentz group, it transforms as a -valued vector under the action of the  part of the gauge group. Therefore while it is a vector field , it is still referred to as a scalar field, as scalar describes its transformation (formally, representation) under the Lorentz group. This is also discussed below in the scalar chromodynamics section.

The Higgs field is modelled by a potential
,
which can be viewed as a generalization of the  potential, but has an important difference: it has a circle of minima. This observation is an important one in the theory of spontaneous symmetry breaking in the Standard model.

Conserved U(1) current
The Klein–Gordon equation (and action) for a complex field  admits a  symmetry. That is, under the transformations

the Klein–Gordon equation is invariant, as is the action (see below). By Noether's theorem for fields, corresponding to this symmetry there is a current  defined as

which satisfies the conservation equation

The form of the conserved current can be derived systematically by applying Noether's theorem to the  symmetry. We will not do so here, but simply verify that this current is conserved.

From the Klein–Gordon equation for a complex field  of mass , written in covariant notation and mostly plus signature,
 
and its complex conjugate
 

 
 

Subtracting the former from the latter, we obtain

 
or in index notation,
 

Applying this to the derivative of the current  one finds

This  symmetry is a global symmetry, but it can also be gauged to create a local or gauge symmetry: see below scalar QED. The name of gauge symmetry is somewhat misleading: it is really a redundancy, while the global symmetry is a genuine symmetry.

Lagrangian formulation 
The Klein–Gordon equation can also be derived by a variational method, arising as the Euler–Lagrange equation of the action

 

In natural units, with signature mostly minus, the actions take the simple form

for a real scalar field of mass , and

for a complex scalar field of mass .

Applying the formula for the stress–energy tensor to the Lagrangian density (the quantity inside the integral), we can derive the stress–energy tensor of the scalar field. It is

and in natural units,

By integration of the time–time component  over all space, one may show that both the positive- and negative-frequency plane-wave solutions can be physically associated with particles with positive energy. This is not the case for the Dirac equation and its energy–momentum tensor.

The stress energy tensor is the set of conserved currents corresponding to the invariance of the Klein–Gordon equation under space-time translations . Therefore each component is conserved, that is,  (this holds only on-shell, that is, when the Klein–Gordon equations are satisfied).

Non-relativistic limit

Classical field
Taking the non-relativistic limit of a classical Klein–Gordon field  begins with the ansatz factoring the oscillatory rest mass energy term,

Defining the kinetic energy ,  in the non-relativistic limit , and hence

Substituting into the free Klein–Gordon equation, yields

which (by dividing out the exponential and subtracting the mass term) simplifies to

This is a classical Schrödinger field.

Quantum field
The analogous limit of a quantum Klein–Gordon field is complicated by the non-commutativity of the field operator.  In the limit , the creation and annihilation operators decouple and behave as independent quantum Schrödinger fields.

Scalar electrodynamics

There is a way to make the complex Klein–Gordon field  interact with electromagnetism in a gauge-invariant way. We can replace the (partial) derivative with the gauge-covariant derivative. Under a local  gauge transformation, the fields transform as

where  is a function of spacetime, thus making it a local transformation, as opposed to a constant over all of spacetime, which would be a global  transformation. A subtle point is that global transformations can arise as local ones, when the function  is taken to be a constant function.

A well-formulated theory should be invariant under such transformations. Precisely, this means that the equations of motion and action (see below) are invariant. To achieve this, ordinary derivatives  must be replaced by gauge-covariant derivatives , defined as 

where the 4-potential or gauge field  transforms under a gauge transformation  as 
. 
With these definitions, the covariant derivative transforms as
 
In natural units, the Klein–Gordon equation therefore becomes
 

Since an ungauged  symmetry is only present in complex Klein–Gordon theory, this coupling and promotion to a gauged  symmetry is compatible only with complex Klein–Gordon theory and not real Klein–Gordon theory.

In natural units and mostly minus signature we have

where  is known as the Maxwell tensor, field strength or curvature depending on viewpoint.

This theory is often known as scalar quantum electrodynamics or scalar QED, although all aspects we've discussed here are classical.

Scalar chromodynamics 
It is possible to extend this to a non-abelian gauge theory with a gauge group , where we couple the scalar Klein–Gordon action to a Yang–Mills Lagrangian. Here, the field is actually vector-valued, but is still described as a scalar field: the scalar describes its transformation under space-time transformations, but not its transformation under the action of the gauge group.

Under a gauge transformation , which can be described as a function  the scalar field  transforms as a  vector

.
The covariant derivative is

where the gauge field or connection transforms as 

This field can be seen as a matrix valued field which acts on the vector space .

Finally defining the chromomagnetic field strength or curvature,

we can define the action.

Klein–Gordon on curved spacetime
In general relativity, we include the effect of gravity by replacing partial derivatives with covariant derivatives, and the Klein–Gordon equation becomes (in the mostly pluses signature)

 

or equivalently,

 

With natural units this becomes

This also admits an action formulation on a spacetime (Lorentzian) manifold . Using abstract index notation and in mostly plus signature this is

or

See also
Dirac equation
Quantum field theory
Quartic interaction
Relativistic wave equations
Rarita–Schwinger equation
Scalar field theory
Sine–Gordon equation

Remarks

Notes

References

External links
 
 
 Linear Klein–Gordon Equation at EqWorld: The World of Mathematical Equations.
 Nonlinear Klein–Gordon Equation at EqWorld: The World of Mathematical Equations.
 Introduction to nonlocal equations.

Partial differential equations
Special relativity
Waves
Quantum field theory
Equations of physics
Mathematical physics